The 1992 Oklahoma State Cowboys football team represented Oklahoma State University in the 1992 NCAA Division I FBS football season. The Cowboys were led by ninth year head coach Pat Jones and played their home games at Lewis Field in Stillwater, Oklahoma. They were a member of the Big 8 Conference. They finished the season 4–6–1, 2–4–1 in Big 8 play finishing in fifth place.

Schedule

Personnel

Coaching staff

Season statistics
Leading rusher: Rafael Denson – 99 attempts for 435 yards and 2 touchdowns. He was also the second leading receiver with 22 receptions for 303 yards and 3 touchdowns.
Leading receiver: Shannon Culver – 41 receptions for 629 yards and 4 touchdowns.  
Leading passer: Gary Porter – 96–188 (51.1%) for 1,280 yards, 7 touchdowns and 14 interceptions.

Team rushing: 438 carries for 1,169 yards and 6 touchdowns.
Team receiving: 116 receptions for 1,542 yards and 10 touchdowns.
Team passing: 116–231 (50.2%) for 1,542 yards and 10 touchdowns and 18 interceptions.

References

Oklahoma State
Oklahoma State Cowboys football seasons
Oklahoma State Cowboys football